Ofer Zeitouni (עפר זיתוני, born 23 October 1960, Haifa) is an Israeli mathematician, specializing in probability theory.

Biography
Zeitouni received  his bachelor's degree in electrical engineering in 1980 from the Technion.

He obtained in 1986 his doctorate in electrical engineering under the supervision of
Moshe Zakai with the thesis Bounds on the Conditional Density and Maximum a posteriori Estimators for the Nonlinear Filtering Problem. As a postdoc he was a visiting assistant professor at Brown University and at the Laboratory for Information and Decision Systems at MIT.  He joined the Technion in 1989 as senior lecturer, and was promoted in 1991 to associate professor, and in 1997 to full professor in the department of electrical engineering. He is now a professor of Mathematics at the Weizmann Institute and at the Courant Institute, and was from 2002 to 2013 a part-time professor at the University of Minnesota.

His research deals with stochastic processes and filtering theory with applications to control theory (electrical engineering), the spectral theory of random matrices,  the theory of large deviations in probability theory, motion in random media,
and extremes of logarithmically correlated fields.

He was Invited Speaker with the talk Random Walks in Random Environments at the ICM in Beijing in 2002. Zeitouni was elected a Fellow of the American Mathematical Society in 2017, member 
of the American Academy of Arts and Sciences in 2019, and member of the
National Academy of Sciences in 2020.

He is married and has two children.

Selected publications

Articles
with Ildar Abdulovich Ibragimov: 
with Amir Dembo, Yuval Peres, and Jay Rosen: 
with Amir Dembo, Bjorn Poonen, and Qi-Man Shao: 
with Amir Dembo, Yuval Peres, and Jay Rosen:

Books
with Greg W. Anderson and Alice Guionnet: Introduction to Random Matrices, Cambridge University Press 2010
with Amir Dembo: Large Deviations Techniques and Applications, Springer 1998,

Sources
Zhan Shi: Problèmes de recouvrement et points exceptionnels pour la marche aléatoire et le mouvement brownien, d’après Dembo, Peres, Rosen, Zeitouni, Seminaire Bourbaki, No. 951, 2005

References

External links
Ofer Zeitouni's home page, Weizmann Institute
Ofer Zeitouni, What happens when a person strolling along an intersecting path chooses directions with a roll of the dice?, Weizmann Institute

1960 births
Living people
Israeli mathematicians
Technion – Israel Institute of Technology alumni
Academic staff of Technion – Israel Institute of Technology
Fellows of the American Mathematical Society
Fellows of the American Academy of Arts and Sciences
Members of the United States National Academy of Sciences
Annals of Probability editors